The Asian Open Figure Skating Classic was a figure skating competition planned to be inaugurated in October 2019 in Taipei City, Taiwan. The competition was categorized as an ISU Challenger Series event.

On July 22, 2019, the International Skating Union revoked the Chinese Taipei Skating Union's right to hold the competition. The event was replaced with the Hong Kong Skating Union's Asian Open Figure Skating Trophy, originally scheduled to be held in August in Dongguan, China. The Challenger Series event would have awarded medals in the disciplines of men's singles, ladies' singles, and ice dance.

The Sports Administration of the Republic of China ordered the removal of Chinese Taipei Skating Union Secretary-General Eddy Wu for mishandling the process. The Sports Administration also suspended funding of the Chinese Taipei Skating Union for one year.

References

External links
 2019 CS Asian Open Figure Skating Classic at the International Skating Union

ISU Challenger Series